The Internet Off-Broadway Database (IOBDB), also formerly known as the Lortel Archives, is an online database that catalogues theatre productions shown off-Broadway.

The IOBDB was funded and developed by the non-profit Lucille Lortel Foundation, named in honor of actress and theatrical producer Lucille Lortel.

See also
 Internet Broadway Database (IBDB)
 Internet Theatre Database (ITDb)
 Internet Movie Database (IMDb)

References

External links
 

Off-Broadway
Online archives of the United States
Theatrical organizations in the United States
Theatre databases
Online databases
Internet properties established in 2001